Seltannasaggart, also called Corry Mountain, is a low mountain near Lough Allen on the border of County Roscommon and County Leitrim in Ireland; it is the highest point in Roscommon.

Geography 
The mountain is the highest point of County Roscommon. On the southern slopes are the remains of a promontory fort and sweat houses.

Access to the summit 
There is a wind farm and a quarry on the summit, which is easily accessible. The Miners Way trail passes over it.

See also 
Lists of mountains in Ireland
List of Irish counties by highest point
List of mountains of the British Isles by height

References

Mountains and hills of County Roscommon
Highest points of Irish counties